Sheridan Township is a township in Scott County, Iowa, USA.  As of the 2000 census, its population was 4,646.

Geography
According to the USGS, it contains one cemetery, Eldridge.

References

 USGS Geographic Names Information System (GNIS)

External links
 US-Counties.com
 City-Data.com

Townships in Scott County, Iowa
Townships in Iowa